Jeff Panzer (born April 7, 1978) is an American former professional ice hockey player.

Panzer was named the United States Hockey League (USHL) Player of the Year for the 1995–96 season. He attended the University of North Dakota from 1998 to 2001, where while playing for their men's ice hockey team, he was named an NCAA First Team All-American and was selected as a finalist for the Hobey Baker Award for both the 1999–2000 and 2000–01 seasons. Panzer was named the 2000–01 WCHA Player of the Year. In 2012, Panzer was named to the College Hockey Weekly "2000s All-Decade First Team".

Panzer went on to play nine seasons of professional hockey, including 281 games in the American Hockey League (AHL) with the Worcester IceCats, Syracuse Crunch and Grand Rapids Griffins.

Awards and achievements

Career statistics

References

External links

Jeff Panzer From Blades to Business (YouTube.com)

1978 births
Living people
Düsseldorfer EG players
Fargo-Moorhead Ice Sharks players
Grand Rapids Griffins players
SC Rapperswil-Jona Lakers players
Syracuse Crunch players
North Dakota Fighting Hawks men's ice hockey players
Worcester IceCats players
American men's ice hockey forwards
AHCA Division I men's ice hockey All-Americans
NCAA men's ice hockey national champions